is a theme park in Nanjo, Okinawa.

Attractions
Okinawa World was originally called , named after the Gyokusendo Caves. There is also a traditional-style village showcasing glass making, Eisa dancing, and Habu snakes.

References

Nanjō, Okinawa